David Kobylík (born 27 June 1981) is a Czech former professional footballer who played as a midfielder.

Career
Kobylík won the Slovak Corgoň liga in the 2009–10 season with MŠK Žilina.

In August 2010, he joined Polonia Bytom. He was released from Polonia Bytom on 27 June 2011.

In July 2011, he signed a one-year contract with Austrian club TSV Hartberg.

Kobylík was also part of the Czech side which won the UEFA U-21 Championship in 2002.

References

External links
 
 
 
 
 

Living people
1981 births
Sportspeople from Olomouc
Association football midfielders
Czech footballers
Czech Republic youth international footballers
Czech Republic under-21 international footballers
SK Sigma Olomouc players
RC Strasbourg Alsace players
MŠK Žilina players
Polonia Bytom players
Arminia Bielefeld players
AC Omonia players
TSV Hartberg players
1. HFK Olomouc players
Czech First League players
Ligue 1 players
Bundesliga players
Slovak Super Liga players
Cypriot First Division players
Czech expatriate footballers
Czech expatriate sportspeople in Slovakia
Czech expatriate sportspeople in France
Czech expatriate sportspeople in Germany
Czech expatriate sportspeople in Cyprus
Czech expatriate sportspeople in Poland
Expatriate footballers in Slovakia
Expatriate footballers in France
Expatriate footballers in Germany
Expatriate footballers in Cyprus
Expatriate footballers in Poland